I'll Be Right Over is a 1942 Czechoslovak comedy film directed by Otakar Vávra.

Cast
 Saša Rašilov as Václav Barvínek - vycpavac zvere
 Vlasta Matulová as Julinka Tichá - florist
 Svatopluk Beneš as Ing. Jirí Hora - chemist
 Theodor Pištěk as Alois Trachta - innkeeper
 Růžena Šlemrová as Miss Demourová - householder

References

External links
 

1942 films
1942 comedy films
1940s Czech-language films
Czechoslovak black-and-white films
Films directed by Otakar Vávra
Czechoslovak comedy films
1940s Czech films